Zarina Zabrisky is an American writer based in the Bay Area, California. She is the author of a novel, We, Monsters, several collections of short stories, including "Explosion", "A Cute Tombstone" and her debut work, "Iron", and a book of collaborative poetry and art, "Green Lions", co-written with Simon Rogghe. Zabrisky currently resides in San Francisco, California.

Career
Since she began to publish her work in 2011, Zabrisky has been a three-time nominee for the Pushcart Prize (nominated by Eleven Eleven Journal of Literature of Art, Red Fez Literary Magazine and Epic Rites Press) and was a finalist for the Normal School's Normal Prize in Fiction, 2012.  Zabrisky also received an editor nomination for the Million Writers Award, an honourable mention for the New Millennium Writings 2012, and was awarded the Acker Award for Achievement in The Avant Garde, 2013.  Zabirsky has been published in over 40 literary magazines and anthologies in the UK, US, Canada, Hong Kong and Nepal.

Zabrisky is also known for her spoken word performances.  She has staged a rock jazz ballet pop musical-thriller "We, Monsters" (based on her novel "We, Monsters"), starring local writers and poets, at Viracocha and Pegasus Books, California.  Zabrisky has appeared at Litquake Festivals in 2012 and 2013.  She has also performed and judged literary merit at the Literary Death Match, held at The Contemporary Jewish Museum and in Los Angeles.  Zarbrisky's stories "Honey-Hued Eyes" and "Wanderlust" were performed by the Liars' League, the former in support of the Gay and Straight Alliance in Hong Kong, 2013.  She has performed at the San Francisco State Poetry reading, Man Ray/Lee Miller-Partners in Surrealism at the Legion of Honour Museum, San Francisco.

Zabrisky has been involved in campaigns concerning the human rights, including Pussy Riot movement, and organised a protest outside the Russian Consulate in 2013.  During interviews after the event, she stated, "The Pussy Riot trial is an insult to me as a writer, a woman, and a human being.  I have been apolitical all my life. Most Russians know that protest in Russia is absurd, ... there is a line, though, where one is so outraged that feelings grow into actions and words, and sometimes actions and words out of the ordinary". She is a co-founder of The Arts Resistance, a movement or artists and writers gathered to resist the injustice and war in the world and support human rights by means of the arts.

Since 2016 Zabrisky has been actively involved in investigative journalism and has been quoted in several books and articles, including Craig Unger's 2018 bestseller, House of Trump, House of Putin, Russian-American historian Yuri Felshtinsky's article on Dimitry Simis, the Antidot, the Voice of Binkongoh and Radio Svoboda.

Along with human rights lawyer Olga Tomchin, Zabrisky has co-produced various seminars on propaganda. In 2018, Zabrisky presented at the Byline Festival in the UK on alleged connections between President Donald Trump and Russia, hybrid war, the "mafia state" and global alt-right movements.

Personal life 

Born in St. Petersburg, Zabrisky is of Russian origin and has stated that she moved to the United States at an age "young enough to forget when it was, and old enough to keep my accent".  She has previously held jobs as a kickboxing instructor, oilfield translator, travel co-ordinator and business liaison in Kazakhstan, street artist and masseuse.

Zabrisky received a degree in English language and Literature at the Philological Faculty at St. Petersburg State University (the alma mater of Putin, Medvedev and Sechin.) This course allegedly contained training in propaganda and brainwashing techniques.

Bibliography 
We, Monsters (Numina Press), 2014
A Cute Tombstone (Epic Rites Press), 2013
Iron (Epic Rites Press), 2012
Green Lions (Numina Press), 2014
Explosion (Epic Rites Press), 2015

References

Russian women writers
American women writers
Living people
Year of birth missing (living people)
21st-century American women